Garra abhoyai is a fish species in the genus Garra endemic to the Chindwin basin in India.

References

External links 

Cyprinid fish of Asia
Fish described in 1921
Garra